The following is a list of episodes for the Japanese novel, manga and anime series Ginban Kaleidoscope. It was produced by Aniplex. It was aired in Japan on October 8, 2005 and ended on December 24, 2005.

Ginban Kaleidoscope